The Western Division of Suffolk was a two-member constituency to the Parliament of the United Kingdom established by the 1832 Reform Act and disestablished in 1885.

History
The seat was created under the Reform Act 1832 as one of two divisions, together with the Eastern Division, of the Parliamentary County of Suffolk. This resulted in a more representative allocation, with a total of four MPs instead of two for the former entire county at large, which still allowed for double voting (or more) of those Forty Shilling Freeholders who also were householders or landlords of any particular boroughs within the county.  This Act retained the four largest boroughs of the seven before 1832.

With two heirs to their title serving the seat, the Marquesses of Bristol, the Hervey family, were major landowners in the county. The modern seat is at Ickworth, with part of its grand house now being a luxury hotel.

Further sweeping changes took place as a result of the Redistribution of Seats Act 1885 which saw the 2 two-member Suffolk divisions being replaced by five single-member constituencies. The Western Division was largely replaced by the North-Western or Stowmarket Division and the Southern or Sudbury Division. A small area in the east was included in the North-Eastern or Eye Division.

MPs

Election results

Elections in the 1830s

Logan's death caused a by-election.

Elections in the 1840s

Rushbrooke's death caused a by-election.

Elections in the 1850s

Elections in the 1860s
Hervey succeeded to the peerage, becoming 3rd Marquess of Bristol and causing a by-election.

Elections in the 1870s

Hervey's death caused a by-election.

Wilson's death caused a by-election.

Elections in the 1880s

References
  

Constituencies of the Parliament of the United Kingdom established in 1832
Constituencies of the Parliament of the United Kingdom disestablished in 1885
Parliamentary constituencies in Suffolk (historic)